Mount Sarrail is a  mountain summit located in Kananaskis Country in the Canadian Rockies of Alberta, Canada. Mount Sarrail is situated 1.0 kilometre north of the Continental Divide, within Peter Lougheed Provincial Park. Its nearest higher peak is Mount Foch,  to the southeast. Mount Sarrail can be seen from Upper Kananaskis Lake and Alberta Highway 40.

History
The mountain was named in 1918 for General Maurice Sarrail (1856-1929), the commander of the French Third Army in World War I.

The mountain's name was officially adopted in 1924 by the Geographical Names Board of Canada.

The first ascent of the mountain was made in 1930 by Kate (Katie) Gardiner and Walter Feuz. The duo also made the first ascents of nearby Mount Foch and Mount Lyautey that same year.

Geology
Mount Sarrail is composed of sedimentary rock laid down during the Precambrian to Jurassic periods. Formed in shallow seas, this sedimentary rock was pushed east and over the top of younger rock during the Laramide orogeny.

Climate
Based on the Köppen climate classification, Mount Sarrail is located in a subarctic climate with cold, snowy winters, and mild summers. Temperatures can drop below −20 °C with wind chill factors below −30 °C. In terms of favorable weather, June through September are the best months to climb Mount Sarrail. Precipitation runoff from the mountain drains into tributaries of the Kananaskis River.

See also
Geography of Alberta

References

Gallery

External links
 Mount Sarrail weather: Mountain Forecast
 Scrambling Mount Sarrail: Explor8ion.com

Three-thousanders of Alberta
Canadian Rockies
Alberta's Rockies